Goldeneye may refer to:

Ian Fleming's life and fiction
 Operation Goldeneye, a World War II operation developed by James Bond author Ian Fleming
 Goldeneye (estate), Ian Fleming's Jamaican estate; currently an all-inclusive hotel
 Goldeneye Hotel and Resort, based at Fleming's Jamaican estate
 Goldeneye (1989 film), a 1989 TV film starring Charles Dance as Ian Fleming, directed by Don Boyd
 GoldenEye, a 1995 James Bond film starring Pierce Brosnan, in which the GoldenEye is a satellite weapon
 "GoldenEye" (song), a song performed by Tina Turner for the 1995 film
 GoldenEye (soundtrack)
 "The Juvenile", a 2002 song written by Jonas "Joker" Berggren from Ace of Base, renamed from "GoldenEye" after the song was cut from the film's soundtrack

Games based on the James Bond film
 GoldenEye (1995 video game), a Tiger Electronics handheld game
 GoldenEye 007 (1997 video game), a video game released for the Nintendo 64
 GoldenEye 007, a cancelled Virtual Boy video game
 GoldenEye: Rogue Agent, a video game released for the PlayStation 2, Xbox and Nintendo GameCube in 2004, and for the Nintendo DS in 2005
 GoldenEye 007 (2010 video game), a video game released for the Wii and Nintendo DS in 2010
 GoldenEye 007: Reloaded, an HD remaster of the video game released a year earlier on Wii, released for PlayStation 3 and Xbox 360 in 2011
 GoldenEye: Source, a total conversion mod of the 1997 video game
 GoldenEye (pinball), a pinball machine produced by Sega in 1996

Other fiction
The Golden Eye, a 1948 mystery film starring Roland Winters as Charlie Chan

Nature
Goldeneye (duck), a duck of the genus Bucephala
A flower species belonging to the plant family Asteraceae in the genus Viguiera (goldeneye) 
 or Heliomeris (false goldeneye)

Other uses
Goldeneye Gas Platform, a gas production platform
Golden Eye Diamond, a  Canary Yellow diamond
Golden Eye, UK trade name for 8chloramphenicol
Golden or amber coloured eyes
Golden Eye, a design award at the Dutch Design Awards
 Golden Eye (album), an album by Christina Aguilar
 Golden Eye (festival), an international film industry festival held in Georgia
 Herreshoff Goldeneye, an American sailboat design

See also
 Reflections in a Golden Eye (disambiguation)